The Saint is a 2017 American action film directed by Ernie Barbarash and starring Adam Rayner in the title role of Simon Templar, created by Leslie Charteris. This was Sir Roger Moore's final film appearance and the film was dedicated to his memory as he died two months before the release; Moore portrayed Templar in a 1960s TV series of the same title. Filmed in 2013 as a television pilot for a proposed TV series, the film was not originally intended for release when the series was not picked up. It eventually saw release direct-to-video in 2017 when it was released in tribute to Moore following his death. Ian Ogilvy, who portrayed Templar in a 1970s TV series titled Return of the Saint, also appears.

Plot 

Simon Templar intervenes when terrorists attempt to trade gold to the Russian Army for bombs. After subduing both parties, he takes most of the gold and escapes, leaving his calling card as "The Saint". Agent Cooper of the FBI has been monitoring the meeting.

Nigerian President Ezekiel Ibaka secures $2.5 billion in private aid for his country, but a mysterious man (Ian Ogilvy) instructs associate Arnie Valecross, a private banker with criminal ties, to steal the funds. He gives Valecross a ring, claiming that it is an heirloom he took from "someone pathetic".

Templar takes the gold from the Moscow heist to an old friend in Bucharest. He gives instructions to distribute the funds among various humanitarian aid organizations.

In Los Angeles, Valecross diverts the funds to one of his own accounts and requests protection from the FBI. His mysterious employer sends his henchman, Rayt Marius, to kidnap Valecross' daughter Zooey, giving Arnie only 48 hours to return the money.

In Paris, France, Templar hears of the Nigerian theft and agrees to help recover the funds. Simon's friend Patricia Holm and the FBI each use their own methods to quickly identify the thief as Valecross and track him to the Grand Del Mar Resort in San Diego.

Special Agent John Henry Fernack, who has been pursuing The Saint for years, gets to Valecross' suite first and unsuccessfully attempts to question him. Templar uses the adjoining room to break into Valecross' suite, but he is discovered. Valecross asks Templar to rescue his daughter. Marius uses a helicopter to fire on Templar through the window. Templar shoots down the helicopter, but Valecross is fatally wounded. As he dies, Valecross tells Templar: "The account numbers are in your ring, the key is in the nomad".

Simon and Patricia engage Doyle Cosentino to develop a new plan now that Valecross is dead. It is revealed that Simon met Patricia in Iraq while escaping from the Russian deal. The trio search for the "nomad" in Valecross' home. Mrs Valecross immediately recognizes Templar. They decide to call Marius, who has a history with Patricia.

Fernack obtains help from the Los Angeles Police Department in the form of Detective Garces (Greg Grunberg). The two men nearly catch Simon when he, Patricia and Doyle leave the Valecross home. The trio notice the men tailing them and escape. Fernack catches up to Templar on a funicular railway car in a busy retail area. Simon overpowers and handcuffs him, escaping by jumping onto a car moving in the opposite direction. Simon, Patricia and Doyle visit former counterfeiter Sonali Alves in her hidden MMA fighting studio and gambling den. They ask for help breaking into Valecross' data storage facility. She forces Simon to battle a fighter in the ring while handcuffed in exchange for the heist gear he needs. During the fight, Simon's handcuffs are broken and he easily defeats his opponent.

Entering the storage facility, Patricia knocks out the guards. She guides Simon as he penetrates the security on two heavy duty doors and disables the pressure-sensitive floor. He uses a glove that mimics fingerprints of a building employee to access the computer server room, and begins searching for the account data. Fernack arrives too late and Simon escapes with the data, locking Fernack in the server room. Outside, Templar finds that Garces has been shot and that Marius has captured Patricia.

Fernack agrees to work with Simon to rescue Patricia and Zooey. Overpowering the armed guards on the boat, they attempt to trade the stolen funds for Marius' hostages. Marius reveals that Patricia is his ex-wife and that he is working for the man who killed Simon's parents. Fernack tries to rescue Zooey but is restrained by her stepmother, who is working with Marius. Templar shoots Marius when tries to use Zooey as a shield, and Patricia knocks him to the floor. Marius refuses to identify his employer.

Zooey returns the money to President Ibaka. Templar evades Fernack.

The mysterious man calls for help from an associate (Roger Moore) who refuses him, knowing their superiors will make an example of him for his failure. Simon tails the mystery man, recognizing him as his parents' killer by a unique tattoo on his arm. Templar identifies him as Xander, hired by Simon's father to train Simon to fight as a youth. Xander warns him that it does not end with him hinting others had a hand as well. Resisting the urge to kill the man, Templar allows Xander to be arrested by Agent Cooper on terrorism charges. Simon disappears from sight while still remembering it never ended with Xander.

Cast

Production
A new television adaptation of The Saint was announced in December 2012; Roger Moore was appointed to produce a new series to star Adam Rayner as Simon Templar and Eliza Dushku as his assistant Patricia Holm. In a later promotion, it was also shown that Moore would star in the new series, as would his successor in Return of the Saint, Ian Ogilvy. Production of a pilot episode was completed by early 2013. As of summer 2014, it was awaiting a broadcast time in the U.S. However, the piece underwent reshoots for the ending and add an extra prologue in November 2015, and the pilot episode was retooled as a TV film, The Saint, getting an online release on 12 July 2017, two months after Moore's death.

The pilot was based upon the character created by Leslie Charteris in 1928, and although the plot of the film has no relation to any of Charteris' stories, the villain, Rayt Marius, was a recurring presence in the early Saint novels, and was the central villain of the 1930 novel The Last Hero.

Although the character of Patricia Holm was a regular presence in the Saint novels from the 1920s through the early 1940s, this was only the second production (after the 1943 film The Saint Meets the Tiger) in which she has appeared.

Inspector John Henry Fernack was also a prominent recurring character in the books.

While the pilot was directed by Simon West, the new material to extend it was directed by Ernie Barbarash.  He had limited windows of availability for Rayner, who was busy on his series Tyrant, and Dushku; in the new material Rayner sports a beard, as in Tyrant, and Templar's new scenes with Holm take place over Skype calls so the actors did not need to be available on the same day.  Inspector Fernack does not appear in the new scenes with the bearded Templar; an equivalent role is filled by Kyle Horne as FBI agent Cooper.  Ian Ogilvy's role was greatly expanded, with new flashbacks to establish his backstory, and Roger Moore recorded new dialogue to replace lines which no longer fit the reworked plot.

References

External links
 

2017 television films
2017 films
2017 action thriller films
2010s spy films
American spy films
American television films
American action thriller films
The Saint (Simon Templar)
Films set in Moscow
Films set in Bucharest
Films set in Los Angeles
Films set in Paris
Films set in San Diego
Films set in London
Films based on television series
Films about theft
Television pilots not picked up as a series
Films directed by Ernie Barbarash
Television films based on television series
2010s English-language films
2010s American films